Margo Reuten (Maasbracht, abt. 1966) is a Dutch head chef, known for her cooking in the Michelin starred restaurant Da Vinci. From 2009 till 2018, she was the only female head chef in the Netherlands holding two Michelin stars.

Reuten describes her cooking style as "classic French" and "loyal to the region". For her classic dishes she uses as much as possible locally sourced ingredients.

Career
Restaurant Da Vinci was opened in 1993. It carries one Michelin star since 1999 and two from 2009 till 2018.

Before Reuten opened restaurant Da Vinci, she had already a lot of experience on high culinary level. She worked as sous chef in restaurant Der Bloasbalg, at that moment bestowed with a Michelin star. Other restaurants where she worked and trained were Toine Hermsen (sous chef), De Swaen (chef de partie) and Prinses Juliana (apprentice chef).

Personal life
Reuten was raised in Maasbracht and is married to Petro Kools.

Awards
 SVH Meesterkok (Master chef): 1990
 Michelin star Da Vinci: 1 star, 1999-2008, 2018–present; 2 stars: 2009-2018
 Freeman of Maasgouw: 2009
 GaultMillau Chef of the Year: 2012
 Relais & Chateaux Grand Chef: 2012

Published books
Together with Petro Kools:
 2003: Proeven van Bekwaamheid (Eng.: Tasting Ability)
 2010: Proeven van Bekwaamheid Special Edition (Eng.: Tasting Ability Special Edition)

References

1966 births
Living people
Dutch chefs
Head chefs of Michelin starred restaurants
People from Maasgouw
Women chefs